Breakthru is an album of solo piano performances by the American jazz pianist Ran Blake recorded in 1975 and released on the Improvising Artists label.

Reception

Scott Yanow of AllMusic stated, "Blake's emotional playing (which emphasizes the contrast between silence and explosive sounds) is both witty and unpredictable... Intriguing music".

Track listing
 "Breakthru" (Ran Blake) - 1:35 		
 "You Stepped Out of a Dream" (Nacio Herb Brown, Gus Kahn) - 3:47 		
 "If Dreams Come True" (Benny Goodman, Irving Mills, Edgar Sampson) - 2:23
 "No Good Man" (Irene Higginbotham, Sammy Gallop, Dan Fisher) - 3:00
 "All the Things You Are" (Oscar Hammerstein II, Jerome Kern) - 2:28
 "Wish I Could Talk to You Baby" (Leon Sylvers III) - 4:58 		
 "Grey December" (Frank Campo) - 3:10 		
 "Spinning Wheel" (David Clayton-Thomas) - 2:00 		
 "Sophisticated Lady" (Duke Ellington, Mills, Mitchell Parish) - 2:36
 "Manhattan Memories: Bird Blues" (Blake) - 1:10
 "Manhattan Memories: Bebopper" (George Gordon, Sonnie Leonard) - 1:45
 "Manhattan Memories: Drop Me Off in Harlem" (Ellington, Nick Kenny) - 1:10
 "All About Ronnie" (Joe Greene) - 2:30
 "What Are You Doing the Rest of Your Life?" (Alan and Marilyn Bergman, Michel Legrand) - 2:50 		
 "Parker's Mood" (Charlie Parker) - 3:41 		
 "Tea for Two" (Irving Caesar, Vincent Youmans) - 2:45

Personnel
Ran Blake – piano

References

1976 albums
Ran Blake albums
Improvising Artists Records albums
Solo piano jazz albums